Curd of Bogra is a special kind of yoghurt which is found only in Bogra. It is a traditional food of Bangladesh and popular all over the world.

History
Ghetu Ghosh of Sherpur in Bogra district is known to be the inventor of Curd of Bogra. On the other hand, Gaur Gopal Ghosh was the inventor of creamed curd in Bogra.

Sir John Anderson, President Yahya Khan, Elizabeth II, Queen Victoria and many other famous persons ate Curd of Bogra. Yahya Khan sent the food to important persons in order to influence them.

Formula
Although the history of Bogra Yogurt is about two and a half years old, the Golden Age was in the pre-independence period. At that time its preparation method was very secret. This privacy could no longer be maintained. Now many traders make yoghurt in Sherpur. The number of Ghosh family members is much less among them.

To make curd of Bogra you need cow's milk, sugar, a small amount of old curd and a clay pot. This curd is made by boiling milk in a pan.

Market
More than 5,000 workers work in curd factories in Bogra. Due to the effect of corona outbreak in 2020, the curd market in Bogra has become almost down. Most of the workers of the curd factories have become unemployed.

Stores
Currently, there are many stores that sell Curd of Bogra:
 Asia Sweetmeat in the city
 Doighar in the city
 Kuranu in Chelopara
 Ruchita in Nawabbari
 Akbaria in Kabi Nazrul Islam Road
 Doibazar in BRTC Market
 Mistimahal
 Satmathar Daighar
 Muharram Ali
 Sherpur Daighar
 Chinipata

Note

References

External links
  

Bogra
Bangladeshi desserts
Bengali desserts
Bangladeshi cuisine
Fermented dairy products
Bangladeshi dairy products